The 2014 AFC Women's Asian Cup qualification saw 16 nations attempt to qualify for the 2014 AFC Women's Asian Cup football competition. The four winners from all groups joined the four automatic qualifiers in the final tournament.

This tournament also served as the first stage of qualification for the 2015 FIFA Women's World Cup for the Asian zone.

Participants
Participants from the qualification round were as follows (numbers denote the seeding order):

 1. 
 2. 
 3. 
 4. 
 5. 
 6. 
 7. 
 8. 
 9. 
 10. 
 11. 
 11. 
 11. 
 11. 
 11. 
 11.

Groups
Total sixteen teams were divided into four groups of four, and each group played a single round-robin tournament. The winners of each group qualified for the final tournament. The draw was held on 19 October 2012 in Malacca, Malaysia. The first matches were played on 21 May 2013.

In the round-robin tournaments, teams tied in the points were ranked by the following criteria:
 Greater number of points between the teams concerned,
 Goal differences between the teams concerned,
 Number of goals between the teams concerned,
 Goal differences between in all round-robin matches,
 Number of goals between in all round-robin matches,
 Penalty shoot-out (in case just two teams playing the final match tied in the all conditions above),
 Fewer yellow and red card points in all group matches (1 point for each yellow card, 3 points for each red card as a consequence of two yellow cards, 3 points for each direct red card, 4 points for each yellow card followed by a direct red card), and
 Drawing of lots.

Group A

All matches were played in Jordan (all times UTC+2).

Group B

All matches were played in Bangladesh (all times UTC+6).

Group C

All matches were played in Bahrain (all times UTC+3).

Group D

All matches were played in Palestine (all times UTC+3).

Qualified teams

Direct qualifiers

Qualifying group winners

Goalscorers
9 goals
 Zebo Juraeva

8 goals

 Maysa Jbarah
 Nisa Romyen

7 goals
 Stephanie Al-Naber

6 goals

 Abeer Al-Nahar
 Yee Yee Oo

5 goals
 Nguyễn Thị Minh Nguyệt

4 goals

 Shahnaz Jebreen
 Sama’a Khraisat
 Makhfuza Turapova
 Nguyễn Thị Muôn

3 goals

 Reem Al Hashmi
 Lin Ya-han
 Cheung Wai Ki
 Khin Moe Wai
 Feruza Turdiboeva
 Nguyễn Thị Hòa
 Trần Thị Kim Hồng

2 goals

 Deena Abdelrahman
 Lai Li-chin
 Yu Hsiu-chin
 Fung Kam Mui
 Malik Sasmita
 Maryam Rahimi
 Luna Al-Masri
 Svetlana Tynkova
 Nadia Assaf
 Nadine Schtakleff
 Lara Bahlawan
 Saria Al Sayegh
 Marisa Park
 Jesse Shugg
 Naphat Seesraum
 Huỳnh Như
 Nguyễn Thị Kim Tiến
 Nguyễn Thị Xuyến

1 goal

 Lin Kai-ling
 Sara Ghomi
 Amani Hajji
 Sara Bakri
 Sahar Dbouk
 Hiba El Jaafil
 Taghrid Hamadeh
 Margret Marri
 Naw Ar Lo Wer Phaw
 Caroline Sohgian
 Cat Barnekow
 Heather Cooke
 Christina delos Reyes
 Joana Houplin
 Megan Jurado
 Anootsara Maijarern
 Boontan Anongnat
 Rattikan Thongsombut
 Sunisa Srangthaisong
 Fazilat Bakhromova
 Aziza Ermatova
 Maria Moiseeva
 Kamola Riskieva
 Makhliyo Sarikova
 Tanzilya Zarbieva
 Nguyễn Thị Liễu
 Nguyễn Thị Ngọc Anh

1 own goal

 Trishna Chakma (playing against Thailand)
 Cheung Wai Ki (playing against Vietnam)
 Sarshin Kamangar (playing against the Philippines)

References

External links
AFC Women's Asian Cup, the-AFC.com

2014
2013 in women's association football
Qual
Women's Asian Cup Qualification 2014